Manuguru  - Shri Chhatrapati Shahu Maharaj Terminus Kolhapur Express is an express train of the Indian Railways connecting Shri Chhatrapati Shahu Maharaj Terminus in Maharashtra and Manuguru of Telangana. It is currently being operated with 11303/11304 train numbers on a daily basis.

There is a consideration to terminate this train at either Miraj Jn or Belgaum. 

Passengers demand termination at Miraj as Manuguru express is the only train connecting Western Maharashtra with Hyderabad

Service 

The 11303/Manuguru - SCSMT Kolhapur Express has an average speed of 42 km/hr and covers 997 km in 23 hrs 30 mins. 11304/SCSMT Kolhapur - Manuguru Express has an average speed of 41 km/hr and 997 km in 23 hrs 10 mins.

Route and halts 

The important halts of the train are:
 Manuguru (From 15 March 2018)
  (From 15 March 2018)
  (From 15 March 2018)
 Mahabubabad (From 15 March 2018)
  (From 15 March 2018)
  (From 15 March 2018)
  (From 15 March 2018)
  (From 15 March 2018)
  (From 15 March 2018)
  (Till 15 March 2018)
  (From 15 March 2018)

Coach composite

The train consists of 15 coaches :

 1 AC II Tier
 1 AC III Tier
 7 Sleeper Coaches
 4 General
 2 Second-class Luggage/parcel van

Traction 

Both trains are hauled by a Lallaguda Loco Shed based WAP-7 or WAP-4 electric locomotive from Manuguru to Guntakal and from Guntakal it is hauled by a Guntakal Loco Shed based WDM 3A , WDM 3D, WDG3A diesel locomotive up til Kolhapur and vice versa.

Rake Sharing 

It share its rake with 11051/11052 Solapur - SCSMT Kolhapur Express.

Direction Reversal 

Train Reverses its direction 2 times:

  
 
  (i.e., from 15 March 2018)

See also 

 Solapur - SCSMT Kolhapur Express

Notes 

 Will be extended to Manuguru from 15 March 2018 via Begumpet railway station, Secunderabad Junction, Bhongir railway station, Jangaon railway station, Kazipet Junction railway station Warangal railway station, Mahabubabad, Dornakal Junction railway station, Bhadrachalam Road.
 New Time Table

References

External links 

 11303/Hyderabad - CSMT Kolhapur Express
 11304/CSMT Kolhapur - Hyderabad Express

Transport in Hyderabad, India
Transport in Kolhapur
Express trains in India
Rail transport in Maharashtra
Rail transport in Telangana
Rail transport in Karnataka
Railway services introduced in 2011